Council for Affordable Quality Healthcare, Inc. (CAQH) is a non-profit organization incorporated in California as a mutual benefit corporation. It was first incorporated under the name Coalition for Affordable, Quality Healthcare, Inc., and then renamed the Council for Affordable Quality Healthcare, Inc. on August 8, 2002. It is based in Washington, D.C. Previously a 501(c)6 tax-exempt organization, CAQH changed its tax status in 2016, although it remains a non-profit.

CAQH was formed by a number of the nation’s largest health insurance companies with the goal of creating a forum for healthcare industry stakeholders to discuss administrative burdens for physicians, patients, and payers. Today, its mission is to accelerate the transformation of business processes in healthcare through collaboration, innovation, and a commitment to ensuring value across stakeholders, including healthcare providers, trade associations, and health plans.

Succinctly, CAQH is a group of health insurance companies that sets rules and coordinates information for physicians and other providers.

Initiatives
CAQH has created a number of initiatives with the goal of streamlining the business of healthcare: CAQH CORE, CAQH Solutions, and CAQH Explorations. CAQH Solutions include CAQH ProView, DirectAssure, CAQH VeriFide, SanctionsTrack, EnrollHub, and COB Smart. CAQH Explorations, the research arm of CAQH, produces the CAQH Index and other healthcare industry analyses.

CAQH CORE

Established in 2005, CAQH CORE (the Committee on Operating Rules for Information Exchange) is a multi-stakeholder collaboration between providers, health plans, vendors, government agencies, and standard-setting bodies with the aim of influencing the direction of health IT policy, developing operating rules that remove unnecessary cost and complexity from the healthcare industry, and identifying opportunities to accelerate the industry’s transition to fully digital business processes.

CAQH CORE participating organizations include health plans representing more than 75% of commercially insured lives, plus Medicare and Medicaid beneficiaries.

The Affordable Care Act (ACA) mandated better standardization of the electronic HIPAA administrative and financial transactions between providers and insurers. In 2012, CAQH CORE was designated by the Department of Health and Human Services (HHS) as the author for ACA-mandated operating rules. Operating rules support a range of existing standards to make electronic data transactions more predictable and consistent, regardless of technology used.

The CAQH CORE process centers on an integrated model consisting of rule development, testing and certification, outreach and tracking measures. In 2012–2013, the organization released operating rules for four transactions now federally mandated for all HIPAA-covered entities: eligibility, claim status, electronic funds transfer and remittance advice (EFT/ERA). In 2015, it announced additional voluntary operating rules for healthcare claims, prior authorization, employee premium payment and employee enrollment and disenrollment.

In 2020, CAQH CORE restructured its operating rules from phase-based rule sets to rule sets based on business transactions.

In February 2020, CAQH CORE members updated requirements for prior authorization and voted to set two-day time limits on how quickly health plans must request additional supporting information from providers and make final determinations on prior authorization requests.

In January 2021, CAQH CORE released new operating rules for patient attribution, or the exchange of data regarding how a patient is assigned to a provider who is then responsible for the quality and cost of his or her care. This process is an essential part of value-based healthcare.

To drive and track market adoption, CAQH CORE offers a certification program so organizations can demonstrate that they have adopted and are adhering to the operating rules.  Organizations that create, use or transmit administrative healthcare data (such as health plans, healthcare providers and vendors) can earn CORE Certification.  In a January 2014 proposed rule, HHS recommended CAQH CORE as the administrator for HHS-required certification of health plans.

CAQH ProView
Launched in 2002 and formerly known as the Universal Provider Datasource®, CAQH today connects more than 1.6 million physicians, nurses, social workers and other professional providers to more than 1,000 health plans, hospitals and other organizations and enables them to exchange provider demographic, credentialing and enrollment data efficiently and securely. Through the collaboration of many health plans and providers, the need for paper credentialing forms that once plagued the industry has virtually been eliminated.

Health plans, hospitals and provider groups may utilize CAQH ProView for provider credentialing, network directories and claims payments. Use of CAQH ProView reduces time and resources needed for these processes; it can also minimize manual error and reduce duplicative paperwork and administrative costs.

To reduce administrative burdens across the dental industry, the American Dental Association and CAQH formed an alliance in late 2017 to help streamline the credentialing process for dentists and dental payers.

DirectAssure
Beginning in 2016, the Centers for Medicare & Medicaid Services (CMS) began reviewing the accuracy of online directories of Medicare Advantage Organizations. The review found that 45.1% of provider directory locations listed in these online directories were inaccurate. Types of inaccuracies included: the provider was not at the location listed; the phone number was incorrect; or the provider was not accepting new patients when the directory indicated they were.

CMS conducted similar audits through 2018, at which time it found 48.74% of the provider directory locations listed had at least one inaccuracy.

DirectAssure improves the quality and accuracy of information used in health plan directories by simplifying the data collection and evaluation process. DirectAssure works with CAQH ProView to enable providers to update directory information and share it with all health plans they designate. In 2019, CAQH announced it had developed artificial intelligence (AI) technology to identify incorrect healthcare provider data and improve the accuracy of directories without contacting the provider.

VeriFide
The provider credential verification solution integrates with CAQH ProView to standardize the credentialing process by which health plans and healthcare organizations verify provider data.

VeriFide extracts data submitted by providers to CAQH ProView and compares 86 percent of the data with primary sources. In a recent audit, the solution achieved 98.5% accuracy and delivered 95% of files within 11 – 14 days.

SanctionsTrack
SanctionsTrack, an add-on feature to CAQH ProView, is an automated, continuous sanctions monitoring solution that reviews multi-state information on provider licensure disciplinary actions.  SanctionsTrack helps organizations eliminate redundant data gathering and follow-up research for sanction notices.

COB Smart
Coordination of benefits is the process by which health plans determine who pays first when more than one health insurance plan is responsible for paying the same medical claim.

COB Smart helps health plans identify instances of patients with overlapping insurance coverage. This CAQH Solution determines which individuals have benefits that should be coordinated, as well as which health plans are primary and secondary insurers, so that corresponding claims can be processed correctly the first time. COB Smart launched in 2014.

COB Smart® COB identifies primary and secondary coverage and determines primacy before claims are paid, to increase payment accuracy and reduce administrative costs associated with recovery.  Today, more than 45 health plans submit weekly member eligibility data to the COB Smart database. The solution then applies proprietary matching logic to identify instances in which a member has overlapping coverage and returns the information to participating health plans. Medical-to-medical overlaps are identified with 99.5 percent accuracy.

The COB Smart portal facilitates investigation of individual member coverage and enables direct payer-to-payer communication and collaboration. In 2020, CAQH launched a validation service that confirms current active coverage status for reported overlaps.

CAQH Explorations
CAQH Explorations is the research arm of the CAQH. It includes the CAQH Index, an annual report which tracks and reports progress by the healthcare industry in its ongoing transition from manual to electronic administrative transactions. The findings of the CAQH Index are based on an analysis of an extensive dataset of administrative transactions between providers and health plans.

The 2020 CAQH Index found that, of the $372 billion widely cited as the cost of administrative complexity in the US healthcare system, the industry can save $16.3 billion by fully automating nine common transactions.  This savings opportunity is on top of the $122 billion in costs the healthcare industry has avoided by streamlining administrative processes.

Other Initiatives

FHIR Endpoints Directory 
In 2020, CAQH announced that it was developing a centralized directory of validated payer Fast Healthcare Interoperability Resources (FHIR) endpoints and third-party applications. This solution will facilitate information sharing between healthcare organizations and app developers, and will help payers meet new Centers for Medicare and Medicaid Services (CMS) interoperability regulations that become effective in 2021 and 2022.

Membership
Members include Aetna, Anthem, America's Health Insurance Plans, AultCare, the BlueCross BlueShield Association, Blue Cross Blue Shield of Michigan, BlueCross BlueShield of North Carolina, BlueCross BlueShield of Tennessee, CareFirst BlueCross BlueShield, Centene Corporation, Cigna, Horizon Blue Cross Blue Shield of New Jersey, Humana, Kaiser Permanente and UnitedHealth Group.

References

External links
 "AHIP: Payers team up to reduce administrative waste.” FierceHealthPayer, June 2015.
 “Healthcare EFT via ACH Volume Exceeds 149 Million Transactions in 2014.” NACHA, February 2015.
 “How to identify who sent your healthcare EFT payment.” Health Data Management, March 2015.
 "Debunking Myths about Healthcare EFT.” Health Data Management, August 2015.
 “COB Smart to Improve Accuracy of COB in the Health Care Industry.” BCBSNC.
 “Service aims to end health coverage conflicts”. LifeHealthPro, February 2014.
 “CAQH offers tool to simplify transactions”. ModernHealthcare, February 2013.
 “Aetna to Insist on CORE Standards Certification”. LifeHealthPro, February 2008.
 "How electronic transactions could save healthcare $8B: 6 areas of opportunity”. Becker's Hospital Review, August 2014.
 "Study: Switch from manual to electronic transactions could save healthcare $8B”. Becker's Hospital Review, March 2015.
 “CAQH: Electronic transactions could save healthcare billions”. EHR Intelligence, August 2014.
 “HHS to Strengthen Enforcement Of HIPAA Transaction Rules”. InformationWeek, January 2014.

Medical and health organizations based in Washington, D.C.
1998 establishments in the United States
1998 establishments in Washington, D.C.
Organizations established in 1998